Paisley Airport  is a public airport located 3 miles (4.8 km) northwest of Paisley, in Lake County, Oregon, United States, and owned by Lake County. It was originally built for the executives of J.R. Simplot company. The airport is not staffed, but, because it is well lit, it can be used day and night.

References

External links

Airports in Lake County, Oregon